The 2023 FIM Moto2 World Championship will be part of the 75th F.I.M. Road Racing World Championship season.

Teams and riders 

All teams use series-specified Dunlop tyres and Triumph 765cc 3-cylinder engines.

Team changes
Forward Racing will enter the 2023 season using motorcycles under their own brand.

Rider changes 
 Dennis Foggia will make his Moto2 debut with Italtrans Racing Team, replacing Lorenzo Dalla Porta.
 Cameron Beaubier will return to the AMA Superbike Championship after two years in Moto2. Skinner raced in the British Superbike Championship in 2022.
 Sergio García will make his Moto2 debut with Flexbox HP40, replacing Jorge Navarro. Navarro will then leave Moto2 for the Supersport World Championship.
 Álex Escrig will make his Moto2 debut with MV Agusta Forward Team, replacing Simone Corsi who will become the rider coach for the team. Escrig raced in both the MotoE World Cup and Moto2 European Championship in 2022.
 Lorenzo Dalla Porta will move to Pertamina Mandalika SAG Team from Italtrans Racing Team, replacing the now-retired Gabriel Rodrigo.
 Albert Arenas will move to Red Bull KTM Ajo from GasGas Aspar Team, replacing Augusto Fernández who will move up to MotoGP.  Moto3 World Riders' Champion Izan Guevara will then move up from Moto3 while remaining with GasGas Aspar Team, replacing Arenas.
 Kohta Nozane will make his full-time debut with Yamaha VR46 Master Camp Team, replacing Keminth Kubo. Nozane has raced before as a replacement rider in the Moto2 and MotoGP classes. Nozane raced in the Superbike World Championship in 2022.
 Darryn Binder and Lukas Tulovic will race for Liqui Moly Husqvarna Intact GP, replacing Jeremy Alcoba and Marcel Schrötter. Alcoba will move to Gresini Racing Moto2, replacing Alessandro Zaccone, while Schrötter will leave Moto2 for the Supersport World Championship. Binder will make his Moto2 debut, having raced in MotoGP in 2022. Tulovic also raced as a replacement rider in MotoE in 2022.
 Borja Gómez will make his full-time debut with Fantic Motor, replacing Niccolò Antonelli who was previously announced to race with the team in 2023, and was also included in the released provisional entry list. Gómez has served as a replacement rider in 2022.

Regulation changes 
The minimum age to have a license for Moto2 was raised to 18 years old.

Calendar 
The following Grands Prix are provisionally scheduled to take place in 2023:

Grand Prix locations

Calendar changes 
 For the first time since 2006, Lusail in Qatar will not host the opening round due to "extensive renovation and remodelling to the paddock area and circuit facilities".
 The British Grand Prix will return to the International Paddock of the Silverstone Circuit for the first time since 2012.
 India and Kazakhstan are both scheduled to host their first World Championship motorcycle Grands Prix in 2023 at the Buddh International Circuit and the Sokol International Racetrack, respectively.
 The Hungarian Grand Prix was scheduled to make its debut in 2023 but was postponed until at least 2024 due to the unfinished construction of the circuit.
 The Aragon Grand Prix was omitted from the schedule for the first time since its introduction in 2010.
 The Finnish Grand Prix at Kymi Ring was under contract to feature in 2023, but was not included in the provisional calendar due to safety concerns of the 2022 Russian invasion of Ukraine.

Results and standings

Grands Prix

Riders' standings
Scoring system
Points were awarded to the top fifteen finishers. A rider had to finish the race to earn points.

Constructors' standings
 Each constructor got the same number of points as their best placed rider in each race.

Teams' standings
The teams' standings were based on results obtained by regular and substitute riders; wild-card entries were ineligible.

Notes

References

External links
 

Moto2
Grand Prix motorcycle racing seasons
Moto2